In Greek mythology, Azan (Ancient Greek: Ἀζᾶν) may refer to the following personages:

 Azan, king of Azania in Arcadia and the son of King Arcas and the Dryad Erato or Leanira, brother of Apheidas, Elatus and Hyperippe. Azan was the father of Cleitor and Coronis, mother of Asclepius by Apollo. When Azan and his brothers grew up, their father Arcas divided the land between them into three parts: Azan received the district which was named after him, to Apheidas fell Tegea and Elatus got Mount Cyllene, which down to that time had received no name. When Azan died, the first funeral games in history were held in his honor. It was at these games that Aetolus accidentally killed Apis. Azan's heir to the throne was his son Cleitor but he was childless, thus succeeded by Aepytus, son of Elatus.
 Azan, husband of Hippolyte, daughter of Dexamenus, who was threatened with violence by the Centaur Eurytion.

Notes

References 

 Diodorus Siculus, The Library of History translated by Charles Henry Oldfather. Twelve volumes. Loeb Classical Library. Cambridge, Massachusetts: Harvard University Press; London: William Heinemann, Ltd. 1989. Vol. 3. Books 4.59–8. Online version at Bill Thayer's Web Site
 Diodorus Siculus, Bibliotheca Historica. Vol 1-2. Immanel Bekker. Ludwig Dindorf. Friedrich Vogel. in aedibus B. G. Teubneri. Leipzig. 1888-1890. Greek text available at the Perseus Digital Library.
 Fowler, Robert L., Early Greek Mythography. Volume 2: Commentary. Oxford University Press. Great Clarendon Street, Oxford, OX2 6DP, United Kingdom. 2013. 
The Homeric Hymns and Homerica with an English Translation by Hugh G. Evelyn-White. Homeric Hymns. Cambridge, MA.,Harvard University Press; London, William Heinemann Ltd. 1914. Online version at the Perseus Digital Library. Greek text available from the same website.
Pausanias, Description of Greece with an English Translation by W.H.S. Jones, Litt.D., and H.A. Ormerod, M.A., in 4 Volumes. Cambridge, MA, Harvard University Press; London, William Heinemann Ltd. 1918. . Online version at the Perseus Digital Library
Pausanias, Graeciae Descriptio. 3 vols. Leipzig, Teubner. 1903.  Greek text available at the Perseus Digital Library.

Princes in Greek mythology
Mythological kings of Arcadia
Kings in Greek mythology
Arcadian mythology